Glyphonycteris is a genus of bat in the family Phyllostomidae. It contains the following species:
 Behn's bat (Glyphonycteris behnii)
 Davies's big-eared bat (Glyphonycteris daviesi)
 Tricolored big-eared bat (Glyphonycteris sylvestris)

References 

 
Bat genera
Taxa named by Oldfield Thomas
Taxonomy articles created by Polbot